The men's 4 x 10 kilometre relay was held on 24 February 2005 at 12:30 CET in Oberstdorf, Germany. The defending world champions were the Norwegian team of Anders Aukland, Frode Estil, Tore Ruud Hofstad and Thomas Alsgaard.

Results

References

FIS Nordic World Ski Championships 2005